Ariapeithes (Ancient Greek: ,) was a king of the Scythians in the early 5th century BCE.

Name

Life
 had three wives, each of whom bore him one son:
an unnamed daughter of the Thracian king Tērēs I, who became the mother of 

Death

References

Sources

 
 
 

Scythian rulers
People from the Bosporan Kingdom
5th-century BC rulers
5th-century BC Iranian people